Courtney Fry (born 19 May 1975) is a British former boxer who competed professionally from 2003 to 2015. As an amateur, he won a gold medal at the 1998 Commonwealth Games and represented Great Britain at the 2000 Sydney Olympics. As a professional, he challenged once for the British, and Commonwealth light-heavyweight titles in 2009.

Amateur
In addition to competing at the Olympic Games he represented England and won a gold medal in the light heavyweight 81 kg division, at the 1998 Commonwealth Games in Kuala Lumpur, Malaysia. Four years later he represented England again at the 2002 Commonwealth Games in the same weight division and reached the quarter final stage.

Professional boxing record

References

External links

1975 births
Living people
Boxers from Greater London
English male boxers
Olympic boxers of Great Britain
Boxers at the 2000 Summer Olympics
Boxers at the 1998 Commonwealth Games
Boxers at the 2002 Commonwealth Games
Commonwealth Games gold medallists for England
Commonwealth Games medallists in boxing
Light-heavyweight boxers
Medallists at the 1998 Commonwealth Games